Rosthwaite is a settlement in the Allerdale borough of Cumbria, England. It is also in Borrowdale in the English Lake District. It lies on the B5289 road to the south of Derwent Water and to the east of the Honister Pass in the county of Cumbria.

Geographical features 
Rosthwaite is host to many interesting post-glacial geographical features. The town nestles underneath the How, a large roche moutonnée, with a smaller roche moutonnée being further to the west.

Near to and within Rosthwaite is also a set of terminal moraines which show the staggered retreat of the Stonethwaite Glacier. These are quite obvious, with the middle and best preserved moraine being found NY 258145.

Governance
Rosthwaite is within the Copeland UK Parliamentary constituency. Trudy Harrison is the Member of Parliament.

Before Brexit for the European Parliament its residents voted to elect MEP's for the North West England constituency.

For Local Government purposes it is in the Keswick Ward of Allerdale Borough Council and the Keswick Division of Cumbria County Council.

Rosthwaite has its own Parish Council; Borrowdale Parish Council.

See also

Listed buildings in Borrowdale

References

Hamlets in Cumbria
Allerdale